TVMSL (TéléVision Mobile Sans Limite) is a project led by Alcatel that plans to develop a DVB-H standard suitable for hybrid satellite and terrestrial transmission. Other partners involved in TVMSL are  Sagem, Alenia, RFS, Philips, DiBcom, TeamCast, UDcast, CNRS, INRIA, CEA-LETI. It is supported by the newly created French Agence de l'innovation industrielle (AII).

Key figures
Total cost of the project: 98 million euros. 
Allocation from AII: 38 million euros. 
Leader : Alcatel.

High-definition television